The Power of Failing is the debut studio album from the Austin, Texas-based emo band Mineral. Released on January 28, 1997, The Power of Failing was made available on both LP and CD format and has since been acclaimed as an essential album from the 90s emo movement.

Reception

The Power of Failing received extreme praise for its songwriting and honest lyrics. Writing for Allmusic, Blake Butler declared the record to be "a keystone album from one of the most well-known and revered emo rock bands of the '90s", stating that "although the structure is relatively simple most of the time, it is the essence of the music which overwhelms." Brandon Stosuy of Pitchfork said that "Part of what makes The Power of Failing a classic is that its raw feel and execution matches its emotions."

Legacy 
The Power of Failing has been recognized as one of the landmark albums of 1990s emo. It has appeared on various best-of emo album lists by NME, Rolling Stone Similarly, "Gloria" appeared on a best-of emo songs list by Vulture. In a retrospective thinkpiece entitled "Mineral's 'The Power of Failing' Dragged Alternative Rock in a More Emotionally Vulnerable Direction", Eddie Cepeda of Noisey stated that "bands like Death Cab for Cutie and Pinback have Mineral to thank for much of their sound."

Track listing
 "Five, Eight and Ten" – 5:26
 "Gloria" – 3:42
 "Slower" – 5:47
 "Dolorosa" – 5:10
 "80-37" – 4:33
 "If I Could" – 5:59
 "July" – 4:24
 "Silver" – 6:56
 "Take the Picture Now" – 3:16
 "Parking Lot" – 3:52
"80-37" and "Take the Picture Now" did not appear on the original LP version.

Personnel
Mineral
Chris Simpson  – guitar, vocals
Jeremy Gomez – bass guitar
Gabriel Wiley – drums
Scott McCarver – guitar

Additional personnel
Andre Zweers – engineering assistant
Paul Drake – photography
Judy Kirschner – engineering assistant
Kevin Reeves – mastering

References

1997 albums
Mineral (band) albums